Blaze Away is a 1922 American silent Western film directed by William Hughes Curran and starring Guinn 'Big Boy' Williams, Molly Malone and Hal Wilson.

Cast
 Guinn 'Big Boy' Williams as Big Boy
 Molly Malone as Molly Melody
 Hal Wilson as Pop Melody
 Edward Burns as Bill Lang 
 Edward W. Borman as Tuck Martin 
 William Hughes Curran as Pablo

References

Bibliography
 Connelly, Robert B. The Silents: Silent Feature Films, 1910-36, Volume 40, Issue 2. December Press, 1998.
 Munden, Kenneth White. The American Film Institute Catalog of Motion Pictures Produced in the United States, Part 1. University of California Press, 1997.

External links
 

1922 films
1922 Western (genre) films
American silent feature films
Silent American Western (genre) films
American black-and-white films
1920s English-language films
Films directed by William Hughes Curran
1920s American films